Trainwreck: Woodstock '99 (also known as Clusterf**k: Woodstock '99) is a 2022 American three-part docuseries about the music festival Woodstock '99. It was released on Netflix on August 3, 2022.

Background
The docuseries depicts the events leading up to the violence and sexual assaults that occurred during the festival. Many concert goers and some musicians who performed at the festival such as Gavin Rossdale, Jonathan Davis, and Fatboy Slim, depict their experiences during the three day festival. Carson Daly, who hosted MTV's TRL from 1998 to 2003, was there to cover the festival. Daly stated, "It started off great, TRL live from the side of main stage interviewing all the bands (like Jay from Jamiroquai)". He "started getting pelted with bottles, rocks, lighters, all of it. It got insane, fast. Nightfall, Limp plays 'Break Stuff' & the prisoners were officially running the prison". While inside the production van, Daly said, "I remember being in a production van driving recklessly through corn fields to get to safety. It was so crazy & a blur now. I just remember feeling like I was in another country during military conflict," during which he thought at some point he was "going to die".

Episodes

Release 
The trailer for Trainwreck: Woodstock '99 was released on July 20, 2022, and the documentary was released on Netflix on August 3, 2022.

Reception
On the review aggregator website Rotten Tomatoes, the series holds an approval rating of 86% based on 21 reviews and a weighted average rating of 6.8/10. The website's consensus reads, "Harrowing but enlightening, Trainwreck is a comprehensive investigation into the structural forces that led to one of the music industry's most infamous disasters." On Metacritic, it was given a normalized score of 76 out of 100 based on 7 critics, indicating "generally favorable reviews".

References

External links

2020s American documentary television series
2022 American television series debuts
Documentary films about music festivals
Documentary films about rock music and musicians
Woodstock Festival